Swinden Street is a light rail station in Australia on the Canberra Metro R1 Civic to Gungahlin line, located on Northbourne Avenue at the intersection of Swinden Street, opposite the Lyneham sports complex. The station serves the suburbs of Lyneham and Downer, with a small dedicated park and ride that opened in December 2020. Bicycle racks are also provided for commuters adjacent to the station.

Light rail services
All services in both directions stop at the station. Although the station is not a major interchange, transfer to local ACTION bus route 18 is possible here.

References

Light rail stations in Canberra
Railway stations in Australia opened in 2019